Pescara San Marco is a railway station in Pescara, Italy. The station opened on 27 November 2005 and is located on the Rome–Sulmona–Pescara railway. The train services are operated by Trenitalia.

Train services
The station is served by the following service(s):

Regional services (Treno regionale) Teramo - Giulianova - Pescara - Chieti - Sulmona - Avezzano

References

This article is based upon a translation of the Italian language version as at January 2015.

Railway stations in Abruzzo
Buildings and structures in the Province of Pescara
Railway stations opened in 2005